This list of tallest buildings in Kunming ranks skyscrapers in Kunming, Yunnan, China by height.  the tallest buildings in Kunming are the  twin towers at Wanda Plaza (Fanya International Finance Building North/South). Before that, the 150-meter (492-foot) Kai Wah Plaza A dominated the skyline for many years.

Kunming is the largest and the capital city of Yunnan Province. It is the political, educational, cultural, financial, economical, communication and transportation center of the province. With an urban population of 3,200,000 and total of 6,193,300 people, Kunming is ranked as the 3rd largest city in Western China (after Chongqing and Chengdu).

Tallest buildings
This includes spires and architectural details but does not include antenna masts. Existing structures are included for ranking purposes based on present height. All the structures in this list has been topped, but some may not be ready to use.

Tallest under construction, approved, and proposed

Under construction
This lists buildings that are under construction in Kunming and are planned to rise at least 90 m (295 feet). Buildings that have already been topped out are not included.

References
General

Specific

External links
 The World's best Skyline

kunming
Skyscrapers in Yunnan
Buildings and structures in Kunming